Marina Kuznetsova (1925–1996) was a Soviet stage and film actress.

Selected filmography
 Krechinsky's Wedding (1953)
 A Fortress in the Mountains (1953)

References

Bibliography 
 Tony Shaw & Denise Jeanne Youngblood. Cinematic Cold War: The American and Soviet Struggle for Hearts and Minds. University Press of Kansas, 2010.

External links 
 

1925 births
1996 deaths
Soviet film actresses
Soviet television actresses